Alexander Alexandrovich Fyodorov-Davydov (16 November 1875 – 26 December 1936) was a Russian children's writer, translator, editor and publisher.

Having debuted with his first book (Zimniye Sumerki, Winter Twilight) in 1895, he authored in all 125 books and brochures for children, as well as a wealth of essays, sketches and articles. He translated into Russian the fairytales by Brothers Grimm (1900) and Hans Christian Andersen (1907) and in 1908 published an acclaimed compilation of Russian mystical folklore.

Fyodorov-Davydov edited and published three journals for children: Delo i Potekha (Business and Fun), Putevodny Ogonyok (Guiding Light) and Ogonyok, the first ever Russian magazine addressed to the readership of four to eight years of age. Among the authors he's managed to engage in these publications were Anton Chekhov, Vasily Nemirovich-Danchenko, Dmitry Mamin-Sibiryak, Pavel Zasodimsky, Konstantin Stanyukovich and Kazimir Barantsevich. He also authored some popular historical essays, some of which enjoyed popular separate editions (The Crusades, 1905). In 1918—1923 Fyodorov-Davydov was the head of the Svetlyachok publishing house.

The art scholar Aleksei Fedorov-Davydov (1900-1969) was his son. German Fedorov-Davydov (1931-2000), a Soviet historian and archeologist was his grandson.

References 

Russian children's writers
Russian editors
1875 births
1936 deaths